Luigi Rizzo has been borne by at least two ships of the Italian Navy in honour of Luigi Rizzo and may refer to:

 , a  launched in 1960 and stricken in 1980.
 , a Bergamini (2011)-class frigate launched in 2015. 

Italian Navy ship names